Nikolay Zheludev  (born 23 April 1955) is a British scientist specializing in nanophotonics, metamaterials, nanotechnology, electrodynamics, and nonlinear optics. Nikolay Zheludev is one of the founding members of the closely interlinked fields of metamaterials and nanophotonics that emerged at the dawn of the 21st century on the crossroads of optics and nanotechnology. Nikolay’s work focus on developing new concepts in which nanoscale structuring of matter enhance and radically change its optical properties.

Career and research

Zheludev started his academic career at the International Laser Centre at Moscow State University, where he also obtained MSc, PhD and DSc. He moved to the UK in 1991, becoming in 2007 the director of the Centre for Photonic Metamaterials and Deputy Director of the Optoelectronics Research Centre of the University of Southampton, one of the world’s leading institutes for photonics research and the largest photonics group in the UK.

Nikolay also works in Singapore, where since 2012 he has founded and directed the Centre for Disruptive Photonic Technologies at Nanyang Technological University. Since 2014 he has been the founding Co-Director of The Photonics Institute, Singapore, Asia leading research organization uniting 250 faculty and researches working in photonics.

Zheludev has led some major multi-million research programmes in the UK and Singapore including UK EPSRC NanoPhotonics Portfolio Partnership (2004–2009), Basic Technology Programme “Nanoscope” (2008–2013), Programme on “Nanostructured Photonic Metamaterials” (2010–2016), Programme on “The Physics and Technology of Photonic Metadevices and Metasystems” (2015–2021), the Singapore Ministry of Education Tier 3 Programmes on “Disruptive Photonic Technologies” (2012–2017) and “Quantum and Topological Nanophotonics” (2016–2022).

He served as the editor-in-chief of the Journal of Optics from 2010 until 2020, and he is currently an Advisory Board Member for Nanophotonics and  ACS Photonics. In 2007, he established the European Physical Society international biennial meeting for nanophotonics and metamaterials, the NANOMETA conference.

Awards and honours
Zheludev was awarded the Young Medal and Prize in 2015 for “Global Leadership and Pioneering, Seminal Work in Optical Metamaterials and Nanophotonics”.  In 2020 he was awarded the President's Science Award, the highest honours bestowed on research scientists in Singapore. Zheludev has also been awarded the Leverhulme Trust Senior Research Fellowship (2000); Senior Research Professorship of the EPSRC (2002); and The Royal Society Wolfson Research Merit Award & Fellowship (2009). He is a Fellow of the European Physical Society (EPS), The Optical Society (OSA), The Institute of Physics (IOP) and the American Physical Society (APS).

In 2018 he was elected as a Fellow of the Royal Society, a fellowship of many of the world's most eminent scientists and the oldest scientific academy in continuous existence. In 2019 he was elected as a foreign member of the United States of America National Academy of Engineering.

Personal life
Nikolay was born in Moscow, Russia. His father physicist and crystallographer Prof. Ivan S. Zheludev worked at the Institute of Crystallography Russian Academy of Sciences, Moscow, Russia and combined his academic work with the post of the Deputy Director General of International Atomic Energy Agency, Austria, Vienna. His mother Dr. Galina Zheludeva was a faculty at Moscow State University. Nikolay’s sister, Prof. Svetlana Zheludeva worked at the Russian Academy of Sciences and his brother Andrey is professor at ETH Zurich. Nikolay is married to linguist Tanya Nousinova, daughter of playwright Ilya Nousinov. They have two sons, Ilya and Ivan.

References

External links

1955 births
Living people
Academics of the University of Southampton
Optical physicists
Academic staff of Nanyang Technological University
Fellows of the American Physical Society
Fellows of the Institute of Physics
Fellows of Optica (society)
Fellows of the Royal Society
Foreign associates of the National Academy of Engineering
Royal Society Wolfson Research Merit Award holders
Metamaterials scientists
Academic staff of Moscow State University